Marc Michel Marrier de Lagatinerie (3 January 1949 – 15 August 1983), known professionally as Marc Porel, was a Swiss-born French film actor. He appeared in 40 films between 1967 and 1983.

Life 
Marc Michel Marrier de Lagatinerie was born in Lausanne, Switzerland on 3 January 1949, the son of Jacqueline Porel (1918–2012), an actress and granddaughter of Gabrielle Réjane, and Gérard Landry, an actor. He had three half siblings, one from an affair his mother had with the singer Henri Salvador : his brother Jean-Marie Périer, and two from her marriage to actor François Périer : his brother Jean-Pierre and sister Anne-Marie. 

He was married twice, first to French model Bénédicte Lacoste, with whom he had a daughter. They divorced, and he remarried to Italian actress Barbara Magnolfi. 

Porel died in Casablanca on 15 August 1983 of Meningitis. He is buried at Passy Cemetery in Paris with his family.

Filmography

References

External links

1949 births
1983 deaths
Burials at Passy Cemetery
People from Lausanne
French male film actors
20th-century French male actors